日本橋 may refer to:

Nihonbashi, a business district of Chūō, Tokyo, Japan, surrounding a famous bridge of the same name
Nipponbashi, a shopping district of Naniwa Ward, Osaka, Japan